Engerdal is the administrative centre of Engerdal Municipality in Innlandet county, Norway. The lake Litle Engeren lies on the north side of the village. Engerdal Church is located in the village.

References

Engerdal
Villages in Innlandet